Sanjin Vrebac (born 25 February 2000) is an Austrian footballer.

Career statistics

Club

Notes

References

2000 births
Living people
Austrian footballers
Austrian expatriate footballers
Association football midfielders
Singapore Premier League players
SV Allerheiligen players
Kapfenberger SV players
Balestier Khalsa FC players
FK Panevėžys players
Austrian expatriate sportspeople in Germany
Expatriate footballers in Germany
Expatriate footballers in Singapore
Austrian expatriate sportspeople in Lithuania
Expatriate footballers in Lithuania